Philip Lutzenkirchen (June 1, 1991 – June 29, 2014) was an American football tight end, who played at Auburn University, finishing his career as the school's all-time leading receiver in touchdowns among tight ends.

College career
Lutzenkirchen was a standout tight end at Auburn, starting for the 2010 championship team as a sophomore. His senior season in 2012 ended prematurely due to a hip injury. Lutzenkirchen ended his career with 59 receptions for 628 yards, and 14 touchdowns, the most in school history by a tight end.

Statistics

Death
Philip Lutzenkirchen and baseball player Joseph Ian Davis, the driver of the vehicle, were involved in a single-vehicle accident that resulted in their deaths on June 29, 2014 around 3 a.m. They both died at the scene while the two other passengers were injured. Lutzenkirchen, who was in the back seat, registered a blood alcohol level of 0.377 while Davis registered a 0.17 (the legal limit in Georgia is 0.08) which made them both legally drunk. Lutzenkirchen was ejected as a result of not wearing a seat belt.

Lutzie 43 Foundation 
In the aftermath of Lutzenkirchen's death, his family set up a foundation, the Lutzie 43 Foundation. The Foundation offers a "43 Lessons to Legacy" character-building curriculum. Students who complete the program are eligible to apply for a scholarship.

References

1991 births
2014 deaths
Auburn Tigers football players
American football tight ends
Players of American football from Illinois
St. Louis Rams players
Sportspeople from DuPage County, Illinois
People from Winfield, Illinois
Road incident deaths in Georgia (U.S. state)
Alcohol-related deaths in Georgia (U.S. state)